Fernando Maldonado may refer to:

 Fernando Maldonado (footballer) (born 1992), Argentine forward
   (1917-1996), Mexican composer